William Anderson (14 January 1868 – 16 August 1940) was an Australian theatre entrepreneur.

He left school at age ten and eventually found work as a theatre manager, marrying the actress Eugenie Duggan. He established two theatre companies and had a profitable association with Charles Holloway, opened Wonderland City in Sydney and built the Kings Theatre in Melbourne. He produced several classics of the Australian stage including Thunderbolt (1905), The Squatter's Daughter (1907) (which he filmed in 1910) and The Man from Outback (1909), as well as co-writing several plays.

Hic comedy company was playing at the Tivoli Theatre, Adelaide in February 1917 when Hugh D. McIntosh's Tivoli Follies company was booked to play at the same venue, resulting in a clash and both managements accusing the other of misrepresentation.

Anderson worked with such actors and writers as Edmund Duggan, Bert Bailey, Olive Wilton and Roy Redgrave and for a time his private secretary was Beaumont Smith. The financial failure of Wonderland City cost him his personal fortune, but he remained involved in theatre productions until the end of his life.

Selected credits
Thunderbolt (1905) - producer
The Squatter's Daughter (1907) – producer
The Man from Outback (1909) – producer
The Squatter's Daughter (1910) – film, producer
The Winning Ticket (1910) – producer, co-writer
By Wireless Telegraphy (1910) – producer, co-writer

References

External links 
William Anderson at Australian Dictionary of Biography
Leann Richards, 'William Anderson' at Aussietheatre.com
 William Anderson's Australian theatre credits at AusStage

Australian theatre managers and producers
1868 births
1940 deaths
 People from Bendigo
Businesspeople from Victoria (Australia)